Stuart Moulthrop (born 1957 in Baltimore, Maryland, United States) is an innovator of electronic literature and hypertext fiction, both as a theoretician and as a writer.  He is author of the hypertext fiction works Victory Garden (1992), which was on the front-page of the New York Times Book Review in 1993, Reagan Library (1999), and Hegirascope (1995), amongst many others. Moulthrop is currently a Professor of Digital Humanities in the Department of English, at the University of Wisconsin–Milwaukee. He also became a founding board member of the Electronic Literature Organization in 1999.

Education
Born in Baltimore, Maryland in 1957, he became an English major at George Washington University after reading Gravity's Rainbow by Thomas Pynchon in 1975.  He received his PhD from Yale University in 1986.  He taught at Yale from 1984–1990, and then at the University of Texas at Austin and the Georgia Institute of Technology.  In 1994 he moved back to Baltimore to teach at the University of Baltimore. As a former Professor of Information Arts and Technologies, he formerly taught in the Bachelor of Science in Simulation and Digital Entertainment. He also was involved in the Master's and Doctoral programs.

Work in hypertext
Moulthrop began experimenting with hypertext theory in the 1980s, and has since authored several articles as well as written many hypertext fiction works.  He has had an article published in Wired magazine His hypertext Victory Garden was featured on the front page of the New York Times Book Review from a review by Robert Coover, and Hegirascope won the Eastgate Systems HYSTRUCT Award.  He served as co-editor for Postmodern Culture and is currently listed as part of their editorial collective. He is partnered with Nancy Kaplan, Michael Joyce, and John McDaid in TINAC (Textuality, Intertextuality, Narrative, and Conscioussness). In 1987, Moulthrop created forking paths for an undergraduate writing class as a demonstration of hypertext, appropriating Borges' "Garden of Forking Paths". This article acknowledges the possibility of having one source of data link to a group of data, which links to other group of data, and so forth until the viewer decides to exit the pool of information.  The work is now available through The New Media Reader cd-rom.

Stuart Moulthrop's Victory Garden, specifically the Web edition, is the subject of two new essays: Mariusz Pisarski's review of it in EBR:, and Dene Grigar's comments in the Digital Review:.

References

External links
Official Website
Interview with Stuart Moulthrop

1957 births
Living people
Writers from Baltimore
University of Wisconsin–Milwaukee faculty
American literary critics
Electronic literature writers
Writers from Wisconsin
Electronic literature critics